47 Days is a 2020 Indian Telugu-language mystery-drama film written and directed by Pradeep Maddali. Produced by Title Card Entertainment, the film stars Satyadev and Pooja Jhaveri with music composed by Raghu Kunche.

The film began its production in 2018 which was delayed due to COVID-19 pandemic. 47 Days was digitally released on 30 June 2020 via ZEE5, and opened to mixed reviews.

Plot 

Satyadev is an ACP whose wife Paddu dies. While inspecting a similar case to the death of his wife, Satyadev becomes a part of a larger issue.

Cast

Production 
The film is directed by Pradeep Maddali, a former software engineer who worked as an assistant director under Puri Jagannadh. He met Satyadev Kancharana  on the sets of Rogue (2017). The film is based on a scene from his short film Juliet (2011) and began production in 2018. Satyadev was signed to play an ACP in the film. The makers of the film obtained the permission to use the name 47 Days after the 1981 film of the same name. The film was scheduled to release in theaters following Satyadev's Uma Maheswara Ugra Roopasya; however, the film released on ZEE5 on June 30, 2020, due to COVID-19 after much delay.

Music 
The songs are composed by Raghu Kunche. Puri Jagannadh released the song "Kya Karoon" on Valentines Day 2018, performed by Neeha Kadiveti with lyrics by Lakshmi Bhupala.

Reception 
47 Days received mixed reviews from critics with praise for performances and technical output but criticism for the storyline and narration. Neeshita Nyayapati of Times of India gave the film two stars out of five, saying "47 Days only works in bits and pieces because Satyadev does enough to ensure you stay invested." Sangeetha Devi Dundoo of The Hindu wrote that, "There’s a lot going on in the film written and directed by Pradeep Maddali, but it ends up as a hotchpotch. The only reason to watch it till the end is its leading man Satyadev, whose empathetic performance goes in vain."

References

External links 
 

Indian mystery drama films
2020s mystery drama films
2020 films
ZEE5 original films
2020 direct-to-video films
2020s Telugu-language films
Films shot in Visakhapatnam
Films scored by Raghu Kunche
Films set in Andhra Pradesh
Indian thriller drama films
Indian mystery thriller films
2020 thriller drama films